Nitroapocynin is a mono-nitrated form of apocynin.

Synthesis
Apocynin can be nitrated with sodium nitrate and acidic ionic liquid 1-butyl-3-methylimidazolium hexafluorophosphate in acetonitrile solvent.

References

Nitrobenzenes
O-methylated phenols
Vanilloids
Aromatic ketones